Vena Annisa  is a notable Indonesian broadcaster. She works for Voice of America creating programs for Indonesian youths and teens.

Personal background

Vena Annisa Dilianasari was born in Jakarta, Indonesia, in August 1978. After graduating from SMA Negeri 8 Jakarta, she pursued tertiary education in Chinese language and mass communication in University of Indonesia. She was a runner-up for None Jakarta. She is also a guest lecturer in University of Indonesia and Program Coordinator in British School of Communication.

She lives in Maryland with her son and husband, and working in VOA office in Washington, D.C.

Broadcasting career and achievements

Upon completing Open Door Exchange Program, she started to work as radio announcer in Prambors radio in Jakarta. At that time, she was the only high-school student announcer. She eventually host the morning prime time segment in Prambors, together with Irfan Ihsan. She then moved into television broadcasting by hosting Buletin Sinetron, an infotainment show in RCTI TV, and various other TV shows.

She founded a production house REC Production in 2002, and produced the first teenager reality show in Indonesia, Katakan Cinta. This show won Panasonic Award for the most popular reality show in 2003.

She is working for VOA, doing youth, teenager, and entertainment segments such as Cek and Ricek and VOA Direct Connection with Irfan Ihsan.

References
Voice of America (in Indonesian)

1978 births
Indonesian television presenters
Indonesian women television presenters
Living people
People from Jakarta
SMA Negeri 8 Jakarta alumni